88 (Arracan) Battery Royal Artillery is currently a gun battery within 4th Regiment Royal Artillery based in Alanbrooke Barracks, Topcliffe, North Yorkshire. The battery was raised in Calcutta, India, on 14 February 1802 and has been known by a variety of names during its existence.  Over its history it has moved between different Royal Artillery Regiments or Battalions due to reorganisations of the Royal Regiment of Artillery and changes in role. However, its title "Arracan" has endured for a considerable period of time.

During the First Anglo-Burmese War of 1825 the battery took part in the expedition from Chittagong to Arracan. The Honour Title 'Arracan' was granted to the battery in 1930 in recognition of this exceptional feat of arms.

88 (Arracan) Battery, the Rednecks are a L118 light gun battery.

Royal Artillery batteries
Military units and formations established in 1802